Arjunrao Narayanrao Bharbhare (born 16 July 1924) was an Indian cricketer. He was a right-handed batsman and right-arm medium-pace bowler who played for Maharashtra. He was born in Bhinga.

Bharbhare made a single first-class appearance for the side, during the 1954-55 season, against Saurashtra. He scored 5 runs in the only innings in which he batted.

Bharbhare bowled 31 overs in the match, taking two wickets and conceding 48 runs.

External links
Arjunrao Bharbare at Cricket Archive 

1924 births
Possibly living people
Indian cricketers
Maharashtra cricketers